The Soul of Broadway is a 1915 American silent crime drama film produced and distributed by the Fox Film Corporation and directed by Herbert Brenon. Popular vaudeville performer Valeska Suratt starred in the film which was also her silent screen debut. The Soul of Broadway is now considered lost. It is one of many silent films that were destroyed in a fire at Fox's film storage facility in Little Ferry, New Jersey in July 1937.

Plot
As described in a film magazine, La Valencia (Suratt), a stage beauty, has ensnared a young man who steals in order to shower her with the luxuries that she demands. He is caught and, after serving a 5-year term, emerges from prison a gray haired man. La Valencia comes across him again, and her passion revives. She seeks to ensnare him again, but now he is married and his old life has no charms for him. Desperate, she then threatens to reveal his past to his wife, which leads to a terrific climax.

Cast
Valeska Suratt - Grace Leonard, aka La Valencia
William E. Shay - William Craig
Mabel Allen - June Meredith
Sheridan Block - Frederick Meredith
George W. Middleton - Monty Wallace
Jane Lee - Grace's Daughter
Gertrude Berkeley - Stage Actress (*Gertrude Berkeley was the mother of Busby Berkeley)

See also
List of Fox Film films
1937 Fox vault fire

References

External links
 
 

1915 films
American silent feature films
1915 crime drama films
1915 romantic drama films
Fox Film films
American crime drama films
American romantic drama films
American black-and-white films
Films based on short fiction
Films directed by Herbert Brenon
Films shot in New Jersey
Lost American films
1915 lost films
Lost romantic drama films
1910s American films
Silent romantic drama films
Silent American drama films